Baurci may refer to several places in Moldova:

Baurci, a commune in Gagauzia
Baurci, a village in Chircăieștii Noi Commune, Căușeni District
Baurci-Moldoveni, a commune in Cahul District
Tatar-Baurci, the former name for Tătărești Commune, Căușeni District